The Basuto is a pony breed from Lesotho and South Africa.

Characteristics 
The Basuto is considered a small horse, since it possesses horse-like characteristics, such as an exceptionally long stride. Basutos have rather heavy heads, long necks and long, straight backs, straight shoulders, and muscular, sloping croups. They have very tough legs and sound, very hard hooves. They can be up to 14.2 hands high (56.8 inches or ~142 cm), but rarely taller. Basutos can be chestnut, brown, bay, gray or black, and have white markings. They are usually sure-footed, fast, fearless and are known for their stamina.

History 
The first horses arrived in South Africa in 1653, when four horses were introduced to the Cape area by the Dutch East India Trading Company. The exact breed of these horses is unknown, but they may have been Arabian, Persian or similar to the Java Pony. They were upgraded later with Arabian and Persian blood.

These original imported horses became the founders of the Cape Horse, which became extremely popular and especially gained an admirable reputation during the Boer Wars. The Cape Horse and the Basuto probably were originally the same horse; with continual infusions of Thoroughbred and Arabian blood the Cape Horse became a larger, better-quality animal, and the Basuto remained smaller and stockier.

Lesotho (formerly known as Basutoland) acquired Cape Horses as spoils of war between the Zulus and the settlers. As a result of harsh conditions and interbreeding with local ponies, the Cape Horse lost much of its height and nobility, and the Basuto pony largely replaced it.

Due to the rocky and hilly terrain the Basuto ponies were continually ridden over (often at great speeds), they developed into tough, sure-footed animals with great stamina and courage. These qualities, however, were nearly the undoing of the breed. The Basuto became so popular that thousands were exported, and many of the best horses were killed in action during the Boer War at the end of the 19th century. There is now a concerted effort to re-establish the Basuto breed.

Uses
Basotho are used for racing, hacking, trekking or polo.

In 2001, two Basuto ponies carried the French poet Laurence Bougault on a trek alone from Lesotho, through South Africa, and northward to Malawi. In all, her trip covered a distance of 3,300 kilometers (2,100 mi) in eight months and became the subject of her book in French, Sous l’œil des chevaux d’Afrique (Under the eyes of African horses), 2003.

See also
Boer pony
Pony
Lesotho
Trail riding

References

External links
The Basuto Pony
The State of the Basotho Pony in Lesotho

Horse breeds originating in South Africa
Horse breeds
Mammals of Lesotho
Mammals of South Africa
Horse breeds originating in Lesotho